Mónica Andrea Vives Orozco, more commonly known as Maía (born 1981 in Barranquilla, Colombia) is a Colombian singer-songwriter.

History
Mónica Vives Orozco (Maía) is the only child of Rafael Vives and Mónica Orozco. She grew up in Prado 15 Mar km from Barranquilla, the capital of the Atlántico Department on Colombia's Caribbean coast.

In 1998 at the age of 16, Maía won the Colombia Suena Bien (English: Colombia Sounds Good) contest organised by Sony Music.

In 2003 at the age of 22, Maía released her first studio album El Baile de los Sueños which was distributed throughout Latin America, Spain and the United States of America. The tracks "Niña Bonita" and "Se Me Acabó El Amor" were released as singles. "Niña Bonita" was used as the main theme for the Colombian telenovela La Costeña y El Cachaco

In 2005 Maía released her second album Natural from which the track "Ingenuidad" was released as a single. Also in 2005 Maía won Best Female Solo Singer in the Premios Shock awards.

In January 2007, Colombian newspaper El Tiempo reported that Maía was dedicating herself to her third album which was promised to be a change of musical direction including collaborations with foreign artists. In September 2010, Maia released a new hit single "Que Será de Mi" in anticipation of the release of the third album.

In 2010, Maía joined forces with Avon as a celebrity judge for Avon Voices, Avon's first ever global, online singing talent search for women and songwriting competition for men and women.

On 26 April 2012, Colombian website vive.in reported that Maía had released her third album Instinto. The first single released from the album is "No Quererte"

Maía continues to perform her material in Colombia and other countries. In addition to Spanish, her native tongue, Maía is also fluent in English and German.

Discography
2003: El Baile de los Sueños
2005: Natural
2012: Instinto

References

 http://www.colarte.com/recuentos/Cantantes/Maia/recuento.htm Accessed 9 February 2010 (in Spanish)
 http://www.eltiempo.com/archivo/documento/MAM-1383266 Accessed 9 February 2010 (in Spanish)
 http://www.eltiempo.com/archivo/documento/MAM-1673013 Accessed 9 February 2010 (in Spanish)
 http://www.eltiempo.com/archivo/documento/MAM-2357060 Accessed 9 February 2010 (in Spanish)
 https://us.imdb.com/title/tt0356249/soundtrack Accessed 12 February 2010
 https://web.archive.org/web/20110311025653/http://www.avonvoices.com/
 http://bogota.vive.in/musica/bogota/articulos_musica/abril2012/ARTICULO-WEB-NOTA_INTERIOR_VIVEIN-11654962.html Accessed 26 April 2012 (in Spanish)
 http://www.maiamusical.com/ Accessed 19 May (In Spanish)

External links
 
 Performance 12 December 2008, Pereira, Colombia and interview in English
 Music video for the single "No Quererte" from the album Instinto

1981 births
Living people
21st-century Colombian women singers
Colombian pop singers
Colombian singer-songwriters
Latin pop singers
Tropipop musicians
People from Barranquilla
Sony Music Colombia artists
Women in Latin music